Fruitland may refer to:

Fruitland, California
Fruitland, Georgia
Fruitland, Idaho
Fruitland, Iowa
Fruitland, Maryland
Fruitland, Missouri
Fruitland, New Mexico
Fruitland Township, Michigan
Fruitland, Utah

"Fruitland" is also a part of the name of:

Fruitland Park, Florida
Upper Fruitland, New Mexico
Fruitland formation, geological deposit in New Mexico and Colorado